Gulab Singh Thakur (born 29 May 1948 in Jogindernagar, Mandi district) is an Indian politician from Bharatiya Janata Party. He was a former speaker and deputy chief minister of Himachal Pradesh Legislative Assembly in India.

He was elected as an MLA from Jogindernagar constituency on ticket of Bharatiya Janata Party and became PWD & revenue minister in 2007 and an MLA in 2012, of Janata Party in 1977, of Indian National Congress in 1990, 1993 and 1998 and as an Independent candidate in 1980. He was unanimously elected to the office of Speaker on 30 March 1998. He has been elected from the Joginder nagar constituency 7 times.

His daughter Sheffali Thakur is married to Anurag Thakur, a union minister of sports & youth affairs and information and broadcasting elected as a Lok Sabha member from Hamirpur and son of Prem Kumar Dhumal, the former Chief Minister of Himachal Pradesh.

References

Speakers of the Himachal Pradesh Legislative Assembly
Living people
People from Jogindernagar
People from Mandi district
1947 births
Himachal Pradesh MLAs 1977–1982
Himachal Pradesh MLAs 1982–1985
Himachal Pradesh MLAs 1990–1992
Himachal Pradesh MLAs 1993–1998
Himachal Pradesh MLAs 1998–2003
Himachal Pradesh MLAs 2007–2012
Himachal Pradesh MLAs 2012–2017
Bharatiya Janata Party politicians from Himachal Pradesh
Janata Party politicians
Indian National Congress politicians